A Game of Thrones is the first novel in A Song of Ice and Fire, a series of fantasy novels by American author George R. R. Martin.  It was first published on August 1, 1996.  The novel won the 1997 Locus Award and was nominated for both the 1997 Nebula Award and the 1997 World Fantasy Award. The novella Blood of the Dragon, comprising the Daenerys Targaryen chapters from the novel, won the 1997 Hugo Award for Best Novella. In January 2011, the novel became a New York Times Bestseller and reached No. 1 on the list in July 2011.<ref>{{cite news |last=Taylor |first=Ihsan |url=https://www.nytimes.com/best-sellers-books/2011-07-10/mass-market-paperback/list.html |title=The New York Times Bestseller List |date=10 July 2011 |work=The New York Times |access-date=2011-07-04 |archive-url=https://web.archive.org/web/20110707124451/http://www.nytimes.com/best-sellers-books/2011-07-10/mass-market-paperback/list.html |archive-date=7 July 2011 |url-status=live }}</ref>

In the novel, recounting events from various points of view,  Martin introduces the plot-lines of the noble houses of Westeros, the Wall, and the Targaryens. The novel has inspired several spin-off works, including several games. It is also the namesake and basis for the first season of Game of Thrones, an HBO television series that premiered in April 2011. A paperback TV tie-in re-edition was published in  March 2013, titled Game of Thrones.

PlotA Game of Thrones follows three principal storylines simultaneously.

In the Seven Kingdoms
Upon the death of Lord Jon Arryn, the principal advisor to King Robert Baratheon, Robert recruits his childhood friend Eddard "Ned" Stark, now Warden of the North, to replace Arryn as Hand of the King, and to betroth his daughter Sansa to Robert's son Joffrey. Ned accepts the position when he learns that Arryn's widow Lysa believes he was poisoned by Robert's wife Queen Cersei Lannister and her family. Shortly thereafter, Ned's son Bran discovers Cersei having sex with her twin brother Jaime Lannister, who throws Bran from the tower to conceal their affair, leaving him comatose and paralyzing his legs.

Ned leaves his castle Winterfell and departs for the capital city, King's Landing, bringing along his daughters Sansa and Arya. Upon arriving in King's Landing to take his post as Hand, Ned finds that Robert is an ineffective king whose only interests are hunting, drinking, and womanizing.

At Winterfell, an assassin attempts to kill Bran while he is unconscious, and Ned's wife Catelyn travels to King's Landing to bring word to Ned. Catelyn's childhood friend, Petyr "Littlefinger" Baelish, implicates Tyrion Lannister, the dwarf brother of Cersei and Jaime, in the assassination attempt. On the road back to Winterfell, Catelyn encounters Tyrion by chance, arrests him, and takes him to the Vale, where her sister Lysa Arryn is regent, to stand trial for the attempt on Bran's life. In retaliation for Tyrion's abduction, his father Lord Tywin Lannister sends soldiers to raid the Riverlands, Catelyn's home region. Tyrion regains his freedom by recruiting a mercenary named Bronn to defend him in trial by combat.

Ned investigates Jon Arryn's death and eventually discovers that Robert's legal heirs, including Joffrey, are in fact Cersei's children by Jaime, and that Jon Arryn was killed to conceal his discovery of their incest. Ned offers Cersei a chance to flee before he informs Robert, but she uses this chance to arrange Robert's death in a hunting accident and install Joffrey on the throne. Ned prepares to send his daughters away from King's Landing and enlists Littlefinger's help to challenge Joffrey's claim; but Littlefinger betrays him, resulting in Ned's arrest. Arya escapes the castle, but Sansa is taken hostage by the Lannisters.

Ned's eldest son Robb marches his army south in response to his father's arrest, and in order to relieve the threat on the riverlands. To secure a strategically necessary bridge crossing, Catelyn negotiates a marital alliance between Robb and the notoriously unreliable House Frey. Robb defeats a Lannister army in the riverlands, capturing Jaime. Tywin sends Tyrion back to King's Landing to act as Hand of the King to Joffrey. When Ned is executed, Robb's followers declare the north's independence from the Seven Kingdoms, proclaiming Robb "King in the North".

On the Wall 
The prologue of the novel introduces the Wall: an ancient barrier of stone, ice, and magic, hundreds of feet high and hundreds of miles long, shielding the Seven Kingdoms from the northern wilderness. The Wall is defended by the Night's Watch: an order of warriors sworn to serve there for life, defending the realm from the fabled Others, an ancient and hostile inhuman race, as well as from the human "wildlings" who live north of the Wall.

Jon Snow, Ned's bastard son, is inspired by his uncle, Benjen Stark, to join the Night's Watch, but becomes disillusioned when he discovers that its primary function is as a penal colony. Jon unites his fellow recruits against their harsh instructor and protects the cowardly but good-natured and intelligent Samwell Tarly. Jon is appointed steward to the leader of the Watch, Lord Commander Jeor Mormont, making him a potential successor to Mormont. Benjen fails to return from an expedition north of the Wall. Six months later, the dead bodies of two men from his party are recovered; these re-animate as undead wights before being dispatched by Jon.

When word of his father's execution reaches Jon, he attempts to join Robb against the Lannisters, but is persuaded to remain loyal to the Watch. Mormont then declares his intention to march north to find Benjen, dead or alive, and to investigate rumors of a "King-beyond-the-Wall" uniting the wildlings.

Across the narrow sea
Across the sea to the east of Westeros live the exiled prince Viserys and princess Daenerys, children of the late "Mad King" Aerys Targaryen, who ruled Westeros before being overthrown by Robert Baratheon. Viserys betroths Daenerys to Khal Drogo, a warlord of the nomadic Dothraki people, in exchange for the use of Drogo's army to reclaim the throne of Westeros. Illyrio Mopatis, a wealthy merchant who has been supporting the penniless Targaryens, gives Daenerys three petrified dragon eggs as a wedding gift. Jorah Mormont, a knight exiled from Westeros, joins Viserys as an adviser. Initially terrified of her new husband and his people, Daenerys eventually embraces her role as Drogo's "khaleesi". Drogo, however, shows little interest in conquering Westeros, and an impatient Viserys tries to browbeat his sister into coercing Drogo. When Viserys publicly threatens Daenerys and her unborn child, Drogo executes him by pouring molten gold on his head.

An assassin seeking King Robert's favor attempts to poison Daenerys, finally convincing Drogo to conquer Westeros. While sacking villages to fund the invasion of Westeros, Drogo is badly wounded, and Daenerys commands the captive folk healer Mirri Maz Duur to save him. The healer, angered by the Dothraki raids against her people, sacrifices Daenerys's unborn child to power the spell to save Drogo's life, which restores Drogo's physical health but leaves him in a persistent vegetative state.

With Drogo completely incapacitated and unable to lead, much of the Dothraki army disperses. Daenerys smothers Drogo with a pillow and has Mirri tied to Drogo's funeral pyre. She places her three dragon eggs on the pyre and enters it herself. When the fire burns out, she emerges unharmed, with three newly hatched dragons. Awe-struck, Jorah and the remaining Dothraki swear allegiance to her.

 Themes 
Throughout the novel, characters are often faced with decisions that match one redeemable trait against another. The Guardian outlines characters who are frequently "forced to choose between their love for those close to them and the greater interests of honour, duty and the realm." In Westeros, Ned ultimately decides to venture south with Robert, leaving much of his family in Winterfell. At the Wall, Jon wrestles with the predicament of joining his half-brother Robb in rebellion or staying with his sworn brothers in the Night's Watch. Daenerys has issue with the Dothraki treatment of those they conquered in Essos. These conflicts characters encounter oftentimes reflect inconsistent decision making. Catelyn initially is overwhelmed by grief and does not leave Bran's bedside while he is comatose, ignoring her political responsibilities, choosing family over duty. But soon after, Catelyn leaves Bran and her family for King's Landing to inform Ned of potential Lannister treason, effectively displaying a more duty fulfilling role. Family, duty, and honor play major roles in conflicts that arise in the story arc, and qualities traditionally categorized as noble oppose each other in resolution. Character decision conflicts and consequence analysis are particular to how Martin wants to portray fantasy.

Martin characteristically deviates from the traditional fantasy model and clear-cut lines of good versus evil. Martin reflects: "I think the battle between good and evil is fought largely within the individual human heart, by the decisions that we make. It's not like evil dresses up in black clothing and you know, they're really ugly". This viewpoint characterizes the book and is evident in the actions of several different families which frequently have conflicts with each other. The Starks' and Lannisters' conflict is a central component of the novel, and the reader receives points of view from both sides. Likewise, Daenerys' storyline develops around the Targaryen's upheaval in Westeros, in which the Starks played a significant role. Martin argues: Having multiple viewpoints is crucial to the grayness of the characters. You have to be able to see the struggle from both sides, because real human beings in a war have all these processes of self-justification, telling ourselves why what we're doing is the right thing.

Viewpoint characters
Each chapter concentrates on the third-person limited point of view of a single character; the book presents the perspective of eight main characters. Additionally, a minor character provides the prologue. Chapter headings indicate the perspective.
 Prologue: Will, a man of the Night's Watch.
 Lord Eddard "Ned" Stark, Warden of the North and Lord of Winterfell, Hand of the King.
 Lady Catelyn Stark, of House Tully, wife of Eddard Stark.
 Sansa Stark, elder daughter of Eddard and Catelyn Stark.
 Arya Stark, younger daughter of Eddard and Catelyn Stark.
 Bran Stark, middle son of Eddard and Catelyn Stark.
 Jon Snow, illegitimate son of Eddard Stark.
 Tyrion Lannister, a dwarf, brother of the twins Queen Cersei and Jaime, son of Lord Tywin Lannister.
 Princess Daenerys Targaryen, exiled daughter of the former king Aerys and sister of Aerys's heir Viserys.

In the later books, certain viewpoint characters are added while others are removed.

Writing
Martin acknowledges several authors who lent their time and expertise during the writing of the novel: Sage Walker, Martin Wright, Melinda Snodgrass, Carl Keim, Bruce Baugh, Tim O'Brien, Roger Zelazny, Jane Lindskold, and Laura Mixon.

Editions

The HarperCollins/Voyager 1996 edition was the British first edition. Its official publication date was earlier than that of the US Bantam edition, but Bantam went to print several months earlier to hand out copies at the American Booksellers Association (ABA). The novel has been translated into many languages and published in multiple editions in hardcover, paperback, e-book, and audio book form. In different languages, the number of books may not be the same. In June 2000, Meisha Merlin published a limited edition of the book, fully illustrated by Jeffrey Jones.

AdaptationsA Game of Thrones and the subsequent novels in the A Song of Ice and Fire series have been adapted into an HBO television series, a comic book series, several card games, board games, video games, and other media.

ReceptionA Game of Thrones has received critical acclaim. Lauren K. Nathan of the Associated Press wrote that the book "grip[s] the reader from Page One" and is set in a "magnificent" fantasy world that is "mystical, but still believable." Steve Perry told readers of The Oregonian that the plot is "complex and fascinating" and the book is "rich and colorful" with "all the elements of a great fantasy novel". Writing in The Washington Post, John H. Riskind commented that "many fans of sword-and-sorcery will enjoy the epic scope of this book" but felt that the book "suffers from one-dimensional characters and less than memorable imagery." Phyllis Eisenstein of the Chicago Sun-Times wrote that, although the book uses many generic fantasy tropes, Martin's approach is "so refreshingly human and intimate that it transcends them." She described it as "an absorbing combination of the mythic, the sweepingly historical, and the intensely personal." John Prior, writing in the San Diego Union-Tribune, called Martin's writing "strong and imaginative, with plenty of Byzantine intrigue and dynastic struggle", and compared it to Robert Jordan's Wheel of Time books, "though much darker, with no comedy or romance to relieve the nastiness."

On November 5, 2019, the BBC News listed A Game of Thrones on its list of the 100 most influential novels.

Awards and nominations
 Locus Award – Best Novel (Fantasy) (Won) – (1997)
 World Fantasy Award – Best Novel (Nominated) – (1997)
 Hugo Award – Best Novella for Blood of the Dragon'' (Won) – (1997)
 Nebula Award – Best Novel (Nominated) – (1997)
 Ignotus Award – Best Novel (Foreign) (Won) – (2003)

References

External links
 
 

1996 American novels
A Song of Ice and Fire books
American fantasy novels
Novels by George R. R. Martin
1996 fantasy novels
American novels adapted into television shows
Works set in castles
Bantam Books books